The 2017–18 season was Blackpool F.C.'s 109th season in the Football League, and their first season back in League One following promotion from the 2016–17 Football League Two Play-Offs, against Exeter. Along with competing in League One, the club also participated in the FA Cup, League Cup and Football League Trophy.

The season covers the period from 1 July 2017 to 30 June 2018.

First-team squad

Statistics

|-
!colspan=14|Player(s) out on loan:

|-
!colspan=14|Player(s) who left the club:

|}

Goals record

Disciplinary record

Transfers

Transfers in

Transfers out

Loans in

Loans out

Competitions

Friendlies
As of 1 June 2017, Blackpool have announced five pre-season friendlies against Southport, Macclesfield Town, Salford City, Radcliffe Borough and Chorley.

League One

League table

Results summary

Results by matchday

Matches
On 21 June 2017, the league fixtures were announced.

FA Cup
On 16 October 2017, Blackpool were drawn at away to Boreham Wood for the first round.

EFL Cup
On 16 June 2017, Blackpool were drawn away to Wigan Athletic in the first round.

EFL Trophy
On 12 July 2017, the group stage draw was completed with Blackpool facing Wigan Athletic, Accrington Stanley and Middlesbrough U23s in Northern Group B. After winning their group, Blackpool were drawn at home to Mansfield Town in the second round. A third round away trip against Shrewsbury Town was next on the cards for the Seasiders.

References

Blackpool F.C. seasons
Blackpool F.C.